Tyholttårnet is a 124 metre tall radio tower with an observation deck in Trondheim, Norway. The tower features a revolving restaurant, at an altitude of 81 metres, which makes one complete revolution per hour.

External links

 http://www.skyscraperpage.com/diagrams/?b29884
 https://web.archive.org/web/20050209232004/http://www.trondheim.com/psmaler/side_med_bilde.asp?thisId=92960924
 

Towers completed in 1985
Buildings and structures in Trondheim
Buildings and structures with revolving restaurants
Towers in Norway
Norkring
Transmitter sites in Norway
1985 establishments in Norway